Kodak Building may refer to:

Kodak Building (Atlanta), a building in Atlanta
Kodak Building 9, a building in Toronto
Kodak Heights, an industrial park in Toronto
Kodak House, an art deco building in Dublin
Kodak Tower, a skyscraper in Rochester, New York